Enrico Taglietti  (16 April 1926 – 3 May 2019) was an Italian-born Australian architect, known for designing a number of acclaimed buildings in Australia. In 2007, he was the winner of the Australian Institute of Architects Gold Medal.

Biography

Enrico Taglietti was born in Milan in 1926 and graduated in 1954 from the Milan Polytechnic University, where he studied under Gio Ponti, Franco Albini, Bruno Zevi and Pier Luigi Nervi. In 1955, he was sent to Australia by the Italian government to find a site in Canberra for the Italian embassy (which he ended up designing). He loved the unspoilt environment of Australia and ended up settling in Canberra from the early 1960s. He designed many iconic buildings, mainly in Canberra, but also in Sydney and Melbourne. They are in a Modernist, sometimes Brutalist, late-20th-century Organic Style, designed "from the inside out", according to the architect, with an emphasis on atmosphere, light and poetry. Taglietti was celebrated in 2018 as the featured architect of the Canberra Design Festival, with a whole day symposium dedicated to his work.

He wrote on his website: “We stand upon the verge of an abyss, the abyss created by the culture of egoism and puritanical righteousness. Men have lost their belief in the invisible. Architecture is no longer a WONDER but a temptation for the profitable. The aim of my architecture is to express the invisible, joy and music, silence, light and the desire to be”.

Taglietti died on 3 May 2019, at the age of 93.

Taglietti was made an Officer of the Order of Australia in the 2020 Australia Day Honours for "distinguished service to architecture, particularly in the Australian Capital Territory, to education, and to professional organisations." The award was announced after his death.

Partial list of works

Embassy of Italy, Deakin (ACT) (1967)
Dickson Library (ACT) (1968)
St Anthony's Catholic Church, Marsfield (NSW) (1968)
St Kilda Library (VIC) (1971)
Flynn Primary School (ACT) (1972)
Giralang Primary School (ACT) (1974)
Australian War Memorial Annex (ACT) (1977)
Gowrie Primary School (ACT) (1981)
Cinema Center, Civic (ACT)
Many private residences all over Canberra

References

1926 births
2019 deaths
20th-century Australian architects
21st-century Australian architects
Italian emigrants to Australia
Officers of the Order of Australia
Architects from Milan
Polytechnic University of Milan alumni
Recipients of the Royal Australian Institute of Architects’ Gold Medal